Calotomus spinidens, the spinytooth parrotfish, is a species of marine ray-finned fish, a parrotfish, in the family Scaridae. It is found in the Indo-Pacific from East Africa to Tonga and the Marshall Islands where it is found in seagrass and weaweedbeds located in coastal bays or deep lagoons.

References

External links
 ITIS
 EOL

spinidens
Taxa named by Jean René Constant Quoy
Taxa named by Joseph Paul Gaimard
Fish described in 1824